is a 2010 Japanese film directed by Yoshihiro Fukagawa. It was screened in the Main Programme of the Panorama section at the 61st Berlin International Film Festival. It is based on Journey Under the Midnight Sun, by Keigo Higashino.

Plot
A pawn shop owner in Osaka is murdered, but due to a lack of conclusive evidence the police lists the man's death as a suicide. Detective Sasagaki, who investigated the case, can't forget the main suspect's daughter Yukiho (Maki Horikita) and the pawn shop owner's son Ryoji.

As time goes by, more mysterious deaths surround Yukiho and Ryoji. Detective Sasagaki, still unable to let go of the pawn shop owner case, discovers startling details about Yukiho and Ryoji.

Cast
Maki Horikita as Yukiho Karasawa
Kengo Kora as Ryoji Kirihara
Keiko Toda as Yaiko Kirihara
Tetsushi Tanaka as Isamu Matsuura
Ayame Koike as Mika Shinozuka
Eichiro Funakoshi as Junjo Sasagaki
Nobuo Kyo as Kazunari Shinozuka
Yurie Midori as Eriko Kawashima
Urara Awata as Noriko Kurihara
Yuki Imai as Ryoji Kirihara (10 years old)
Shiori Fukumoto as Yukiho Nishimoto (10 years old)

See also
Journey Under the Midnight Sun
White Night- Korean version of film

External links
  
 
 Review at Variety

References

2010 films
Films based on Japanese novels
Films based on works by Keigo Higashino
Films directed by Yoshihiro Fukagawa
2010s Japanese-language films
Lesbian-related films
2010s Japanese films

ja:白夜行#映画（日本版）